The Iroquois use a wide variety of medicinal plants, including quinine, chamomile, ipecac, and a form of penicillin.

Amaryllidaceae
Allium tricoccum, decoction is used to treat worms in children, and they also use the decoction as a spring tonic to "clean you out". Also eaten as a part of traditional cuisine.

Asteraceae (Aster, daisy, composite, or sunflower family)
Cichorium intybus, decoction of the roots is used as a wash and applied as a poultice to chancres and fever sores.
Solidago rugosa, whole plant used for biliousness and as liver medicine, and decoction of its flowers and leaves for dizziness, weakness or sunstroke. 
Symphyotrichum novae-angliae, is used in a decoction for weak skin, use a decoction of the roots and leaves for fevers, use the plant as a "love medicine",  and use an infusion of whole plant and rhizomes from another plant to treat mothers with intestinal fevers,.

Brassicaceae (Mustards, Crucifers, or Cabbage family)
Cardamine diphylla, infusion of the whole plant taken to strengthen the breasts. The Iroquois also chew the raw root for stomach gas, apply a poultice of roots to swellings, take a cold infusion of the plant for fever and for "summer complaint, drink a cold infusion of the roots for "when love is too strong", and use an infusion of the roots when  "heart jumps and the head goes wrong." They also use a compound for chest pains. They also take an infusion of the plant at the beginning of tuberculosis. They also eat the roots raw with salt or boiled.

Cyperaceae (Sedge family)
Carex oligosperma, a compound decoction of the plant as an emetic before running or playing lacrosse.

Ericaceae (Heath or Heather family)
Epigaea repens, a compound is used for labor pains in parturition, compound decoction used for rheumatism, decoction of the leaves taken for indigestion, and  adecoction of the whole plant or roots, stalks and leaves taken for the kidneys.

Fabaceae (Legume, pea, or bean family)
Apios americana, consumed as food.
Senna hebecarpa, plant used as a worm remedy and take a compound decoction as a laxative.

Grossulariaceae
Ribes triste, fruit mashed, made them into small cakes, and stored them for future use. They later soak the fruit cakes in warm water and cook them a sauce or mix them with corn bread. They also sun dry or fire dry the raw or cooked fruit for future use and take the dried fruit with them as a hunting food.

Lamiaceae (Mint, deadnettle, or sage family)
Agastache nepetoides, compound infusion of plants used as a wash for poison ivy and itch.

Onoclea (Sensitive Fern)
Onoclea sensibilis, used in both oral and topical forms, a decoction extensively applied for women's issues (to initiate menses, fertility, pain and strength after childbirth and stimulating milk flow), for early tuberculosis, treating baldness, as a gastrointestinal aid for swelling and cramps, for arthritis and infection.  A poultice of the top leaves was used for deep cuts and infection. A cold compound infusion of the entire fern plant was washed on sores and taken for venereal disease, e.g. gonorrhea.

Osmundaceae (Royal fern family)
Osmunda claytoniana, used for blood and venereal diseases.

Papaveraceae (Poppy family)
Chelidonium majus, infusion mixed with another plant and milk given to pigs that drool and have sudden movements.

Pinaceae
Abies balsamea, steam from a decoction of branches used as a bath for rheumatism and parturition, and ingest a decoction of the plant for rheumatism. They take a compound decoction for colds and coughs, sometimes mixing it with alcohol. They apply a compound decoction of the plant for cuts, sprains, bruises and sores, and use steam   They apply a poultice of the gum and dried beaver kidneys for cancer. They also take a compound decoction in the early stages of tuberculosis, and they use the plant for bedwetting and gonorrhea.
Pinus rigida, pitch used to treat rheumatism, burns, cuts, and boils. Pitch also used  as a laxative. A pitch pine poultice used to open boils and to treat abscesses.

Ranunculaceae (Buttercup or crowfoot family)
Ranunculus acris, poultice of the smashed plant to the chest for pains and for colds, infusion taken of the roots for diarrhea, and apply a poultice of plant fragments with another plant to the  skin for excess water in the blood.

Rosaceae (Rose family)
Agrimonia gryposepala, drink made from the roots used to treat diarrhea,
Potentilla canadensis, pounded infusion of the roots given as an antidiarrheal. 
Waldsteinia fragarioides, a compound decoction of  the plants used as a blood remedy, and poultice of the smashed plants applied to snakebites.

References

Iroquois culture